Christian Arceo (born December 1, 1990), professionally known as Vybe Beatz, is an American record producer from San Jose, California. Vybe is best known for producing, hip hop R&B, and Trap instrumentals. He is also known for originally producing "All the Way Turnt Up" by Roscoe Dash, & Travis Porter.

Early life
When Arceo was 13, he started downloading software programs off of the very popular limewire, which is how he found the first Digital Audio WorkStation (DAW) Sony Acid, because he was very intrigued about composing music after he had started, he did some research on other DAW's and came across Fl Studio. He liked working on this so much that it would keep him up all day and night, and even after school he couldn't wait to create music.

Career
Vybe was one of the first musicians to reach over 200 million plays on soundclick. He produced the hit single by Roscoe Dash titled "All the Way Turnt Up". A controversy started around this song once another rap group Travis Porter recorded an alternate version to this song using the production made by Vybe, and didn't feature Dash as the main artist / writer. Because of this, Dash re-recorded the song, and even had another producer K.E. on the Track re-produce the instrumental, and Dash featured this as his hit single for his debut album with interscope records.

Production credits

Production equipment and style
Vybe likes to keep his studio equipment simple yet efficient, he uses an  AKAI Advance 49 Keyboard, Yamaha HS8's Studio monitors, Beyerdynamic DT 770 studio headphones, and various software plugins which includes Kontakt, Massive, and Keyscape. Vybe's style is described as versatile, smooth, melodic, bass, and bounce  which also includes his popular "Vibe" producer tag which was originally sampled from a 2007 Pontiac Vibe commercial.

Influences 
Aside from him inspiring himself to make good music, Vybe stated his influences  comes from Scott Storch, & The Runners.

References

External links

1990 births
Living people
American hip hop record producers
American rhythm and blues keyboardists
Businesspeople from California